The Dianchi bullhead, Pseudobagrus medianalis, is a species of catfish in the family Bagridae. It is endemic to the Lake Dianchi basin in Yunnan, China. It can grow to  TL. It is a cryptic, benthic fish that hides during the daytime and forages on small fishes and aquatic invertebrates at night.

Habitat and conservation
This species was once a common fish in Lake Dianchi, but is now mainly restricted to spring systems draining to the lake. This habitat is under threat from pollution and from conversion into fish ponds. An ex-situ conservation effort has been planned.

References

medianalis
Endemic fauna of Yunnan
Freshwater fish of China
Taxonomy articles created by Polbot
Fish described in 1904
Taxobox binomials not recognized by IUCN